Wood Lawn is a historic mansion located off Ryders Lane on the Douglass Campus of Rutgers University in the city of New Brunswick in Middlesex County, New Jersey. The house was added to the National Register of Historic Places on March 8, 1978, for its significance in architecture and education. It is currently used by the Eagleton Institute of Politics.

History and description
The house was built by Colonel James Neilson (1784–1862) in 1830 on land purchased in 1720 by his mother's grandfather, Johannis Voorhees. Neilson served on the Rutgers Board of Trustees from 1833 until 1862. In 1850, a kitchen wing was added. In 1868, bay window extensions were added by his son, James Neilson (1844–1937), who was a trustee from 1886 until 1937. The last major changes were made by the architectural firm of McKim, Mead & White in 1905. The previous Victorian architecture was transformed into its present Classical Revival style.

Gallery

See also
National Register of Historic Places listings in Middlesex County, New Jersey

References

External links
 

Rutgers University buildings
Buildings and structures in New Brunswick, New Jersey
National Register of Historic Places in Middlesex County, New Jersey
New Jersey Register of Historic Places
Houses on the National Register of Historic Places in New Jersey
University and college buildings on the National Register of Historic Places in New Jersey
1830 establishments in New Jersey
Neoclassical architecture in New Jersey
McKim, Mead & White buildings